Daniel Herrera may refer to:
Danny Herrera (musician) (born 1969), American drummer with Napalm Death and Anaal Nathrakh
Danny Herrera (strongman) (1937–2008), American powerlifter
Daniel Herrera (baseball) (born 1984), American Major League Baseball 
Daniel Herrera (rugby union) (born 1963), Uruguayan rugby union coach
Daniel Rendón Herrera, Colombian drug lord
Daniel (Chino) Herrera, Mexican comedian and actor